Samuel Ezra Eshaghoff (/'eʃæɡɑf/; born July 30, 1992) is an American real estate developer and former professional test-taker. He is the Managing Principal of West Egg Development, a New York-based real estate development and investment company. In 2011, he was charged with impersonation and related crimes in connection with charging students to take standardized tests on their behalf. His operations caused the College Board and the Educational Testing Service to reform the way that standardized tests are secured and administered.

Early life 
Eshaghoff was born in 1992 in Great Neck, New York to an Iranian Jewish family. His father Roland Eshaghoff is a real estate manager and his mother Janet Esagoff is a real estate attorney. He was raised in Great Neck and attended John L. Miller Great Neck North High School. He attended the University of Michigan, later transferring to Emory University. He ultimately earned his Bachelor of Business Administration (BBA) degree from the Zicklin School of Business in New York, majoring in finance and real estate.

Test taking 
Eshaghoff was discovered to have been operating a test-taking enterprise while in high school whereby he charged students to take standardized tests, including the SAT and ACT, on their behalf. Reports estimate that Eshaghoff had taken standardized tests for between 7 and 20 students, charging between $1,500 and $3,600 per exam. Eshaghoff consistently scored in the 97th percentile or better.

Eshaghoff was arrested and charged by the district attorney of Nassau County for impersonation and falsification of business documents. He was caught after prosecutors and ETS worked with school officials to compare students' SAT scores with their grade point averages, and conduct handwriting analyses. Eshaghoff was represented by Long Island attorney Matin Emouna.

Aftermath 
Eshaghoff and the district attorney’s office agreed to conditionally discharge the case, provided that Eshaghoff perform substantial community service in tutoring underprivileged students. Eshaghoff withdrew his attendance from Emory University.

In response to Eshaghoff's operation, the College Board and ETS were forced to make radical changes to the administration and security of the SAT exam. The College Board hired former FBI Director Louis Freeh to oversee test security and make substantial changes to test administration nationwide, including a requirement that students upload photos of themselves into a database and regulations on the types of permitted identification. The ACT exam, administered by ACT Education also underwent a major security reform. The College Board also began providing law enforcement and government agencies the names of people believed to be engaged in cheating. They have also considered alerting schools when test takers will be coming from other school districts and reducing the number of times the test is administered overseas. The announcement was made at a hearing of the New York State Senate's subcommittee on higher education, and Eshaghoff's methods specifically influenced the new legislation.

The College Board has twice since made reforms to improve test integrity.

Media 
Eshaghoff was interviewed for CBS’s 60 Minutes in an episode titled "The Perfect Score: Cheating on the SAT". The segment featured Kurt Landgraf, who was the President of the Educational Testing Service at the time, and Kathleen Rice, who was the District Attorney at the time. The interview was conducted by Alison Stewart.

In 2013, the Lifetime network aired The Cheating Pact, a television film based on Eshaghoff's story, starring Daniela Bobadilla, Laura Ashley Samuels, Laura Slade Wiggins, Max Carver, and Cynthia Gibb.

Real estate 
Eshaghoff is the founder and Managing Principal of West Egg Development, a New York-based real estate development and investment manager. His firm is involved in projects in the Greater New York City area.

 Eshaghoff's firm is developing 36-apartment project on East 53rd Street in East Flatbush, Brooklyn.
 According to The New York Times, Eshaghoff purchased the property located at 22-80 Steinway Street in Astoria, Queens in July 2020.
 Eshaghoff is known to be developing a luxury mixed-use building at 215-16 Northern Boulevard in Bayside, Queens.

Recognition 
 Eshaghoff was named in the "2020 Ones to Watch" by the New York Real Estate Journal among "up and coming professionals as well as industry veterans across all areas of real estate".
 Eshaghoff is known for having developed and sold the first $1 million dollar homes in the East New York neighborhood of Brooklyn. He built the properties, located at 710-714 Wortman Avenue, in 2018.

References 

Living people
1992 births